Team Bangladesh Football Club is a Palauan association football club founded in 2004 that plays in the Palau Soccer League. They have won the Palau Soccer League season three times.

History
Team Bangladesh was founded in 2004 as a club to take part in the new Palau Soccer League, which started the same year. Other teams in Palau were also formed in 2004 to take part in the league, but Team Bangladesh were the only one of these original teams to remain in the league for the 2012 season.

Honors
Palau Soccer League: 3
2005, 2006–07, 2012.

Players

2012 Squad

References

Football clubs in Palau
2004 establishments in Palau
Diaspora sports clubs
Association football clubs established in 2004
Bangladeshi diaspora